Bruniges is a surname. Notable people with the surname include: 

Michele Bruniges (born 1957), Australian teacher and education administrator
Rob Bruniges (born 1956), British fencer and coach

See also
Brunies